The military ranks of Imperial Iran are the military insignia used by the Military of Imperial Iran.

Commander-in-chief insignia

Commissioned officer ranks
The rank insignia of commissioned officers.

Other ranks
The rank insignia of non-commissioned officers and enlisted personnel.

References

External links
 

Military ranks of Iran
Imperial Iranian Armed Forces